Dimitrios Panourgias (1754-1834), a Greek military commander during the Greek War of Independence,

Early life 
He was born Dimitrios Xiros in the village of Dremissa to parents who originated from the village Agios Georgios in Phocis. The legend had that his godfather, who baptised him, thought he was a girl and named him with the female name "Panorea" (Πανωραία/very beautiful), and by that name, in the masculine form, he was by then being called.

Klepht and Armatolos 
Panourias in early age took part in the Orlov revolt, against the Ottomans, under Lambros Katsonis. In 1790 he entered the armatoluk of Androutsos Verousis (father of Odysseas Androutsos) and for a short time became commander of the Salona armatoluk with the support of Ali Pasha, but quickly abandoned his position and turned himself into a klepht. 

In 1816, however he rejoined Ali Pasha and was once more appointed as an armatolos in the Salona district. It was there where he became a member of the Filiki Eteria.

Greek War of Independence 
On 24 March 1821 he declared the Revolution in Salona, forcing the surrender of the Ottoman garrison on 10 April. The surrendering Ottomans were massacred by Panourgias' men; by his personal intervention, he managed to save a handful of them.

He then collaborated with Athanasios Diakos and Dyovouniotis in order to halt Omer Vryonis from advancing further into Central Greece. Panourgias with his band was to defend the hills of Chalkomata, near Thermopylae, but was seriously wounded during the fights and had to withdraw.

He later was one of the defenders of the eponymous inn in the Battle of Gravia Inn, and fought in the Battle of Vasilika, the surrender of Corinth, the Battle of Ambliani, the battle of Haidari, the Battle of Distomo, and other battles.

He participated in January, 1822 to the First National Assembly at Epidaurus as representative of Salona. He retired from military operations some months later, after he handed the leadership of his militia band to his son, Nakos Panourgias. 

He died in 1834 at Salona.

References 

1754 births
1834 deaths
People from Kallieis
Members of the Filiki Eteria
Greek military leaders of the Greek War of Independence